Oncoba is a genus of plants in the family Salicaceae. It contains the following species:
 Oncoba brachyanthera Oliv.
 Oncoba breteleri Hul
 Oncoba routledgei Sprague
 Oncoba spinosa Forssk.

References

 
Salicaceae genera
Taxa named by Peter Forsskål
Taxonomy articles created by Polbot